Flash Gordon Classic is a 2015 animated fan film made by Robb Pratt. It is a remake of "The Tunnel of Terror", the second episode of the 1936 Flash Gordon serial.

Plot
Star quarterback Flash Gordon and his girlfriend Dale Arden are kidnapped by scientist Hans Zarkov and forced to join him on an intergalactic voyage to the planet Mongo. There, the trio are quickly captured by the forces of Ming the Merciless. As Ming holds Dale captive, he sends Flash and Zarkov into the Tunnel of Terror, where they must engage in a gladiatorial battle against a giant monster. Flash uses a stone like a football to fend off the monster, but as it has him pinned to the ground with its claw, Princess Aura throws a ray gun, which Flash uses to kill the monster. Ming calmly reprimands his daughter for her actions, but she insists for him to keep Flash alive for her, as she eventually champions him to leading a rebellion against her father’s regime over Mongo.

Cast
 Eric Johnson as Flash Gordon
 Joe Whyte as Hans Zarkov
 G. K. Bowes as Dale Arden
 John Newton as Ming the Merciless
 Jennifer Newton as Princess Aura

Production
In creating Flash Gordon Classic, Robb Pratt drew inspiration from the 1930s Flash Gordon serial starring Buster Crabbe after learning of it as one of the major influences behind Star Wars. Realizing he could not replicate Alex Raymond's elaborate artwork from the comics, Pratt based his designs on 1940s science fiction pulp magazines. Like Pratt's previous works, Superman Classic and Bizarro Classic, Flash Gordon Classic uses hand-drawn animation with digital paint and effects. The soundtrack consists of Clifford Vaughan's score from the Flash Gordon serials and Heinz Roemheld's score from the 1934 film The Black Cat.

Eric Johnson, who played the title character in the 2007 Flash Gordon TV series, loosely reprises his role in this short film. This also marks Pratt's third consecutive collaboration with John Newton and wife Jennifer, who play Ming the Merciless and Princess Aura, respectively.

References

External links
 
 Filmmaker's website

2010s American animated films
2010s science fiction films
2015 short films
American animated science fiction films
Flash Gordon
American animated short films
2010s English-language films